1922 Zulu, provisional designation , is a carbonaceous asteroid in a strongly unstable resonance with Jupiter, located in the outermost regions of the asteroid belt, and approximately 20 kilometers in diameter. It was discovered on 25 April 1949, by South African astronomer Ernest Johnson at Union Observatory in Johannesburg, and named for the South African Zulu people.

Orbit and classification 

Zulu is one of few strongly unstable asteroids located near the 2:1 orbital resonance with the gas giant Jupiter, that corresponds to one of the prominent Kirkwood gaps in the asteroid belt.

It orbits the Sun at a distance of 1.7–4.8 AU once every 5 years and 10 months (2,126 days). Its orbit has an eccentricity of 0.48 and an inclination of 35° with respect to the ecliptic. The body's observation arc begins with its official discovery observation at Johannesburg, as no precoveries were taken and no prior identifications were made.

Zulu was lost shortly after its 1949-discovery (see Lost asteroid), and only rediscovered in 1974 by Richard Eugene McCrosky, Cheng-yuan Shao and JH Bulger based on a predicted position by C. M. Bardwell of the Cincinnati Observatory. It is quite highly inclined for asteroids in the asteroid belt, with an inclination of 35.4 degrees. This may be related to its 2:1 resonance with Jupiter.

Physical characteristics 

In May  2002, a rotational lightcurve of Zulu was obtained from photometric observations by American astronomer Robert Stephens at the Santana Observatory in California. Lightcurve analysis gave a well-defined rotation period of 18.64 hours with a brightness variation of 0.11 magnitude. One month later, French amateur astronomers René Roy and Laurent Brunetto obtained another lightcurve with a concurring period of 18.65 hours and an amplitude of 0.09 magnitude.

According to the survey carried out by NASA's Wide-field Infrared Survey Explorer with its subsequent NEOWISE mission, Zulu measures 12.41 and 20.561 kilometers in diameter and its surface has an albedo of 0.055 and 0.16. The Collaborative Asteroid Lightcurve Link assumes a standard albedo for a carbonaceous C-type asteroid of 0.057 and calculates a diameter of 19.30 kilometers with an absolute magnitude of 12.3.

Naming 

This minor planet was named after the South African Zulu people, in recognition of the tribesmen who devotedly worked at the Johannesburg Union Observatory. The name also closely relates to 1362 Griqua and 1921 Pala, which also received tribal names and librate in the 2:1 ratio of Jupiter's mean motion as well. The official  was published by the Minor Planet Center on 20 February 1976.

See also 
 Griqua group

References

External links 
 Asteroid Lightcurve Database (LCDB), query form (info )
 Dictionary of Minor Planet Names, Google books
 Asteroids and comets rotation curves, CdR – Observatoire de Genève, Raoul Behrend
 Discovery Circumstances: Numbered Minor Planets (1)-(5000) – Minor Planet Center
 
 

001922
Discoveries by Ernest Leonard Johnson
Named minor planets
19490425